Sclater's antwren (Myrmotherula sclateri) is a species of bird in the family Thamnophilidae. It is found in the Amazon Basin.

Its natural habitat is subtropical or tropical moist lowland forests.

The common name and the Latin binomial commemorates the British zoologist Philip Lutley Sclater.

References

Sclater's antwren
Birds of the Amazon Basin
Sclater's antwren
Sclater's antwren
Taxonomy articles created by Polbot